Matthew Archibald (1745 – January 18, 1820) was an Irish-born farmer, tanner and political figure in Nova Scotia. He represented Truro Township in the Nova Scotia House of Assembly from 1785 to 1799.

He was born in Derry, Northern Ireland, the son of Samuel Archibald and Eleanor Taylor, and came with his family to Londonderry, New Hampshire in 1757. The family moved to Nova Scotia five years later. In 1767, Archibald married Janet Fisher. He was named a justice of the peace and became coroner for Colchester District in 1786. He lived at Bible Hill; Archibald is believed to have given the town its name. Bible Hill continues to celebrate a festival in Archibald's honor yearly to commemorate his birthday. Archibald died in Truro.

His son Alexander Lackie Archibald also represented Truro in the assembly.

References 

 A Directory of the Members of the Legislative Assembly of Nova Scotia, 1758-1958, Public Archives of Nova Scotia (1958)

1745 births
1820 deaths
Canadian people of Ulster-Scottish descent
Nova Scotia pre-Confederation MLAs
People from Colchester County
People from County Londonderry
Irish emigrants to pre-Confederation Nova Scotia
Ulster Scots people